was a Japanese composer, conductor and violinist.

Kishi spent his childhood in Miyakojima, a district of Osaka. Following the example of his mother, he learned to play the violin. At the age of 18 he went to Europe to complete his training as a violinist at the Geneva Conservatory and the Berlin School of Music. He then studied composition with Paul Hindemith and conducting with Wilhelm Furtwängler. In 1934, at the age of 25, he conducted the Berlin Philharmonic. As a composer, Kishi's composition includes orchestral works, stage works, chamber works, film scores and songs. In 1935, he went back to Japan.

In 1937, the 28-year-old Kishi Kōichi died of a heart condition in Japan.

Works
Symphony Buddha
Japanese sketches for large orchestra
Japanese Suite for large orchestra
Violin Concerto 
Ballet Ama no iwato (2 acts)
Operetta Namiko (3 acts)
Violin Sonata in D minor

External links

References

1909 births
1937 deaths
20th-century classical composers
20th-century Japanese composers
20th-century Japanese male musicians
Japanese classical composers
Japanese male classical composers
Pupils of Paul Hindemith
Musicians from Osaka Prefecture